John "Jack" Henderson (31 July 1844 – 13 July 1932) was an Irish international footballer who played club football for Ulster as a goalkeeper.

Henderson earned three caps for Ireland at the 1885 British Home Championship.

External links
NIFG profile

1844 births
1932 deaths
Irish association footballers (before 1923)
Pre-1950 IFA international footballers
Ulster F.C. players
Association football goalkeepers